Lenci may refer to :
 Pablo Lenci (born 1972), former Argentine footballer
Francesco Lenci
Ivaldo Lenci Sr. (born 1945), American politician 
Ruggero Lenci (born 1955), Italian architect
Sergio Lenci (1927–2001), Italian architect
Lenci dolls felt doll makers from Turin.